was a junior college in Kōfu, Yamanashi, Yamanashi Prefecture, Japan.

The institute was founded in 1966 by Yamanashi Prefecture.closed at 2006.

Japanese junior colleges